Frank van der Geest (born 30 April 1973) is a Dutch former footballer who played as a goalkeeper in the Eredivisie for Sparta Rotterdam, in the Eerste Divisie for AZ Alkmaar, Heracles Almelo and FC Volendam, and in the English Football League for Darlington. He also spent time with amateur club ADO '20.

He took up beach soccer, and was a member of the Netherlands national beach soccer team that played at the 2013 FIFA Beach Soccer World Cup in Tahiti.

References

External links
 

1973 births
Living people
Sportspeople from Beverwijk
Dutch footballers
Dutch beach soccer players
Association football goalkeepers
AZ Alkmaar players
Sparta Rotterdam players
Heracles Almelo players
Darlington F.C. players
FC Volendam players
Eerste Divisie players
Eredivisie players
English Football League players
ADO '20 players
Dutch expatriate footballers
Expatriate footballers in England
Dutch expatriate sportspeople in England
Footballers from North Holland